Blondie Knows Best is a 1946 American comedy film directed by Abby Berlin and starring Penny Singleton, Arthur Lake, Larry Simms, and Marjorie Ann Mutchie. It is the eighteenth of the 28 Blondie films.

Plot

Dagwood is under the threat of a lawsuit by a rival firm. But their choice as a process server is the terminally nearsighted Shemp Howard, who repeatedly fails to serve the summons.

Cast
 Penny Singleton as Blondie
 Arthur Lake as Dagwood
 Larry Simms as Baby Dumpling
 Marjorie Ann Mutchie as Cookie
 Daisy as Daisy the Dog
 Steven Geray as Dr. Schmidt
 Jonathan Hale as J.C. Dithers
 Shemp Howard as Jim Gray
 Jerome Cowan as Charles Peabody
 Danny Mummert as Alvin Fuddle
 Ludwig Donath as Dr. Titus
 Arthur Loft as Mr. Conroy

References

External links
 
 
 
 

1946 films
Columbia Pictures films
American black-and-white films
1946 comedy films
Blondie (film series) films
Films directed by Abby Berlin
1940s American films
1940s English-language films